Birendra Prasad is an Indian politician. He was a Member of Parliament, representing Nalanda, Bihar in the Lok Sabha the lower house of India's Parliament as a member of the Janata Party.

References

External links
Official biographical sketch in Parliament of India website

Lok Sabha members from Bihar
Janata Party politicians
1932 births
Living people
Bharatiya Jana Sangh politicians
India MPs 1977–1979